The Idaho State Industrial School Women's Dormitory in St. Anthony, Idaho was completed in 1924 from 1920 plans designed by the architectural firm Tourtellotte & Hummel. It was listed on the National Register of Historic Places on November 17, 1982.

It is a two-story hip-roofed brick building on a full, concrete basement. It has a four-column, low-pedimented portico.

History 
Founded in 1903, the Idaho State Industrial Reform School was home to the region's most wayward youth. Children were sent here, most against their will, to be reformed. The conditions were reportedly so bad that some of the 'inmates' chose to take their own lives. On the property, there are 22 unmarked graves of children who died under suspicious circumstances. Towards the end of the twentieth century, the former girl's dormitory and the infirmary building next door were decommissioned and eventually sold to various families who transformed them into their homes.

In the media

Television
The Idaho State Industrial Reform School and Infirmary building were featured on an episode of Ghost Adventures in 2019. The team investigated reports from the current family who lives here of the ghost of girl named Hope Chacon, a 14-year-old Mexican girl who committed suicide by hanging herself in the dormitory building in 1941.

References

School buildings completed in 1920
Colonial Revival architecture in Idaho
History of women in Idaho
Residential buildings on the National Register of Historic Places in Idaho
School buildings on the National Register of Historic Places in Idaho
1920 establishments in Idaho
National Register of Historic Places in Fremont County, Idaho